Sultan Ali Chaudhry was a former Chairman, Board of Directors of Zarai Taraqiati Bank Limited and a former Pakistan government minister and adviser to Prime Minister of Pakistan.

He was also held various positions:
 President, Chamber of Agriculture, Punjab
 Member of Advisory Council of Integrated Rural Development Program 
 Member of Agriculture Pesticide Technical advisory Committee of Pakistan
 Member, Provincial Council Punjab
 Member of National Assembly (Pakistan)
 Minister of Agriculture, Government of Punjab, Pakistan 
 Managing Director, Zimcon (Pvt.) Ltd
 Managing Director Punjab Farm Machinery Corp. (Pvt.) Ltd

In 2002, Chaudhry stood as PML-N candidate for the Faisalabad division in the provincial elections.

He is also author of various books concerning agriculture
State Of Agriculture In Pakistan, Brite Books, 2006, 
Pakistan aur ziraat (in Urdu), Brite Books, 2007, 
Lectures & Articles on Agriculture, Caxton Printing Press

References

Pakistani businesspeople
Politicians from Punjab, Pakistan
Living people
Year of birth missing (living people)